FC Talas is a Kyrgyzstani football club based in Talas, Kyrgyzstan that played in the top division in Kyrgyzstan, the Kyrgyzstan League.  The club plays its home games at Zhashtyk Stadion.

History 
1992: Founded as FC Manas Talas.
1993: Renamed FC Talas.
1994: Renamed FC Manas Talas.
1997: Renamed FC Manas-Dinamo Talas.
1998: Renamed FC Manas Talas.
1999: Renamed FC Boo-Terek Talas.
2000: Renamed FC Manas-Dinamo Talas.
2003: Renamed FC Manas-Ordo Talas.
2006: Renamed FC Talas.
2007: Renamed FC Shadikan Talas.
2008: Renamed FC Dzheruy-Altyn Talas.
2012: Renamed FC Talas.
2013: Dissolved.
2016: Refounded FC Talas.

Achievements 
Kyrgyzstan League:
11th place: 2000, 2003

Kyrgyzstan Cup:
1/4 finals: 2012

Current squad

Former players 

  Jamiu Azeez Adeshina

External links 
Career stats by KLISF
Profile at Footballfacts

Football clubs in Kyrgyzstan
1992 establishments in Kyrgyzstan
Association football clubs established in 1992